John Solomon (born May 23, 1970) is an American comedian and writer.

Biography 
Solomon was born in Omaha, Nebraska, but grew up in Huntington Beach, California. He started his comedy career as an improv comedy performer at The Groundlings in Los Angeles.

Solomon wrote for Saturday Night Live from 2006 to 2014, serving as co-writing supervisor in his final season. He is the writing partner of comedian Will Forte, collaborating on the screenplay for MacGruber, and working together on Extreme Movie. He was a director, writer and producer for the television series The Last Man on Earth.

External links

1970 births
Living people
Male actors from California
American male comedians
American male screenwriters
American television writers
People from Huntington Beach, California
American male television writers
Comedians from California
Screenwriters from California
21st-century American comedians
21st-century American screenwriters
21st-century American male writers